Colonel Muammar al-Gaddafi is the largest mosque in Tanzania and the second largest in East Africa after the Uganda National Mosque in Uganda. It is located in the Tanzanian capital of Dodoma. 

It was named after the former Libyan Brotherly Leader and Guide of the Revolution Muammar Gaddafi who provided the funds for its construction via the World Islamic Call Society. The mosque was inaugurated by President Jakaya Kikwete in 2010 and has a capacity for at least 3,000 worshippers.

See also
  Lists of mosques 
  List of mosques in Africa
 Islam in Tanzania
 Uganda National Mosque

References

Mosques in Tanzania
Buildings and structures in Dodoma
Muammar Gaddafi